Eocuculus cherpinae is a prehistoric bird, known from postcranial remains from the late Eocene Florissant beds in Colorado.

References

Eocene birds